A dwarf spiral galaxy is the dwarf version of a spiral galaxy.  Dwarf galaxies are characterized as having low luminosities, small diameters (less than 5 kpc), low surface brightnesses, and low hydrogen masses. The galaxies may be considered a subclass of low-surface-brightness galaxies.

Dwarf spiral galaxies, particularly the dwarf counterparts of Sa-Sc type spiral galaxies, are quite rare.  In contrast, dwarf elliptical galaxies, dwarf irregular galaxies, and the dwarf versions of Magellanic type galaxies (which may be considered transitory between spiral and irregular in terms of morphology) are very common.

It is suggested that dwarf spiral galaxies can transform into dwarf elliptical galaxies, especially in dense cluster environments.

Examples

 NGC 5474
 NGC 247
 NGC 6503
 NGC 3928
 NGC 625
 NGC 1051
 NGC 1311
 NGC 2188

Location

Most identified dwarf spiral galaxies are located outside clusters. Strong gravitational interactions between galaxies and interactions between galaxies and intracluster gas are expected to destroy the disks of most dwarf spiral galaxies.   Nonetheless, dwarf galaxies with spiral-like structure have been identified within the Virgo Cluster and Coma Cluster.

References

 

Galaxy morphological types

cs:Spirálová galaxie